Maverick is the forty-fourth studio album by American musician Hank Williams Jr. It was released by Curb/Capricorn Records on February 18, 1992. "Hotel Whiskey," "Come On Over to the Country" and "Lyin' Jukebox" were released as singles. The album peaked at number 7 on the Billboard Top Country Albums chart and has been certified Gold by the RIAA.

Track listing
"Come On Over to the Country" (Hank Williams Jr.) – 3:03
"Lyin' Jukebox" (Randy Archer, Bobby P. Barker) – 2:27
"Wild Weekend" (Peter Newland) – 3:47
"The Count Song" (Williams Jr.) – 4:05
"I Know What You've Got Up Your Sleeve" (Jerry Cupit, Tony Stampley, Kevin Stewart) – 2:38
"Hotel Whiskey" (Williams Jr.) – 3:47
duet with Clint Black
"Fax Me a Beer" (Williams Jr.) – 2:47
"Low Down Blues" (Williams) – 2:18
"A Little Less Talk and a Lot More Action" (Keith Hinton, Jimmy Alan Stewart) – 3:20
"Cut Bank, Montana" (Max D. Barnes, Skip Ewing) – 4:41

Personnel

 Eddie Bayers - drums
 Barry Beckett - keyboards
 Clint Black - background vocals
 Mark Casstevens - banjo
 Dan Dugmore - steel guitar
 Chris Eddy - background vocals
 Steve Gibson - mandolin
 Mike Haynes - trumpet
 Jim Horn - baritone saxophone
 Dann Huff - electric guitar
 Mike Lawler - keyboards
 "Cowboy" Eddie Long - steel guitar
 Terry McMillan - harmonica
 Carl Marsh - Fairlight, programming
 Don Potter - acoustic guitar
 Suzi Ragsdale - background vocals
 Michael Rhodes - bass guitar
 Matt Rollings - keyboards
 Charles Rose - trombone
 Gove Scrivenor - autoharp
 Troy Seals - background vocals
 Lisa Silver - background vocals
 Denis Solee - tenor saxophone
 Jo-El Sonnier - accordion
 Joe Spivey - fiddle
 Harry Stinson - background vocals
 Hank Williams Jr. - lead vocals
 Reggie Young - electric guitar

Chart performance

References

1992 albums
Hank Williams Jr. albums
Curb Records albums
Capricorn Records albums
Albums produced by Barry Beckett
Albums produced by James Stroud